This page presents the results of the men's and women's volleyball tournament during the 1971 Pan American Games, which was held from July 31 to August 11, 1971 in Cali, Colombia.

Men's indoor tournament

Preliminary round

GROUP A

GROUP B

GROUP C

Final Round

Final ranking

Women's indoor tournament

Round Robin

Final ranking

References
 Men's Results
 Women's Results

1971
1971 Pan American Games
Pan American Games